The 2016–17 Texas State Bobcats women's basketball team represented Texas State University in the 2016–17 NCAA Division I women's basketball season. The Bobcats, led by fifth year head coach Zenarae Antoine, played their home games at Strahan Coliseum and were members of the Sun Belt Conference. They finished the season 16–15, 11–7 in Sun Belt play to finish in a tie for fourth place. They lost in the quarterfinals of the Sun Belt women's tournament to Louisiana–Lafayette. They were invited to the WBI where they lost to Eastern Washington in the first round.

Roster

Schedule

|-
!colspan=9 style="background:#8C1919; color:#FFCC33;"| Non-conference regular season

|-
!colspan=9 style="background:#8C1919; color:#FFCC33;"| Sun Belt regular season

|-
!colspan=9 style="background:#8C1919; color:#FFCC33;"| Sun Belt Women's Tournament

|-
!colspan=9 style="background:#8C1919; color:#FFCC33;"| WBI

See also
 2016–17 Texas State Bobcats men's basketball team

References

Texas State
Texas State Bobcats women's basketball seasons
Texas State